Tamushal may refer to:
 Bala Tamushal
 Pain Tamushal